David Johnston (born 14 December 1954) is an Australian cricketer. He played in ten first-class and nineteen List A matches for South Australia between 1978 and 1990.

See also
 List of South Australian representative cricketers

References

External links
 

1954 births
Living people
Australian cricketers
South Australia cricketers
Cricketers from Melbourne